Ion Iuliu Haidu (known as János Hajdu) (born 1 January 1942) is a Romanian former footballer who played as a forward.

International career
Ion Haidu played four friendly games and scored two goals at international level for Romania, scoring a goal in his debut, a 3–2 victory against East Germany. In his second game for the national team he scored Romania's goal in the 1–1 against Poland. He also played four games and scored one goal for Romania's Olympic team.

Honours
Dinamo București
Divizia A: 1963–64, 1964–65, 1970–71
Cupa României: 1963–64, 1967–68
Chimia Râmnicu Vâlcea
Divizia B: 1973–74
Cupa României: 1972–73

References

External links

Ion Haidu at Labtof.ro

1942 births
Living people
Romanian footballers
Romania international footballers
Association football forwards
Liga I players
Liga II players
FC Brașov (1936) players
FC Dinamo București players
Chimia Râmnicu Vâlcea players